Murphy High School, in Mobile, Alabama, is a public high school operated by the Mobile County Public School System that educates grades 9–12.

History

In 1922, the Mobile County Public School System (MCPSS) began to plan for the construction of a new high school that would serve the entire county, as the facilities of the now venerable 80 years old Barton Academy structure of Greek Revival architecture, in downtown, were becoming overcrowded and suffering from inadequate maintenance and difficult to maintain. In 1923 the Mobile County School Board acquired  from the Carlen family for the site of their proposed high school complex.

The cornerstone of the school was laid on 14 December 1925, and on 26 April 1926, Mobile High School opened. Construction costs totaled $850,000 for the first six buildings with an additional $200,000 spent on the gymnasium and the indoor pool installed in 1930. Two years after its opening the school's name was changed to Murphy High School in honor of Samuel Silenus Murphy, MCPSS superintendent from 1900 to 1926. While still called Mobile High School, the yearbook had been called the Mobile High Annual. At the change of the name to Murphy High School, the workers did not want to change the name of the yearbook. They agreed to shorten the name to Mohian, a shortened version of Mobile High Annual. The school's colors are gold and blue. Their mascot is a panther.

The school was desegregated in 1963 when three African American students brought a case against the Mobile County School Board for being denied admission to the then all-white school. The court ordered that the three students be admitted to Murphy for the 1964 school year. By the fall of 1970, following stringent desegregation efforts in Alabama, 1,500 of the school's 2,140 students were African American. At the same time, the school had 34 African American teachers on its 87-member faculty.

In 1982 Murphy High School was placed on the National Register of Historic Places by the U.S. Department of the Interior. In 1987 it was selected as a Presidential Model School by the U.S. Department of Education. Redbook magazine named Murphy as one of the top high schools in the United States and one of the largest high schools in Alabama in 1994. Murphy students were featured in the Seventeen magazine issue for November 1996 fashion trends in high school. Several students from the classes of 1997 and 1998 were included in the magazine.

On December 25, 2012, Murphy High School was hit directly by an EF2 wedge tornado, which caused significant damage to the campus. Students and faculty were relocated. They finished the remainder of the 2012 school year at the former Shaw High School in west Mobile while the Murphy campus was rebuilt. On August 19, 2013 the renovated storm-damaged high school campus reopened.

Academics
Murphy has 14 Advanced Placement courses, the International Baccalaureate program, and the International Baccalaureate Diploma Programme.

Notable alumni

Buddy Aydelette, former NFL player, Green Bay Packers 
James M. Fail, philanthropist
Kathryn P. Hire, NASA astronaut
Frank Howard, former football head coach and athletic director for the Clemson Tigers
Bobby Jackson, former NFL player
Joey Jones, NFL player and NCAA coach
Alex Lincoln, former Auburn University and San Francisco 49ers linebacker
Ivan Maisel, college football writer for ESPN
Jim Mason, former MLB player (Washington Senators, Texas Rangers, New York Yankees, Toronto Blue Jays, Montreal Expos)
Keith McCants, former football player for the University of Alabama and the Tampa Bay Buccaneers.
Mardye McDole, former NFL player, Minnesota Vikings
Captain Munnerlyn, professional football player of the Carolina Panthers
Solomon Patton, former NFL player
Sidney Phillips, US Marine
Dennison Robinson, Former Arena Football League player for the Chicago Rush
Phil Savage, Philadelphia Eagle Player Personnel Executive, Senior Bowl Executive Director
Billy Shipp, former NFL and CFL player
Don Siegelman, former governor of the state of Alabama
Cleo Simmons, former NFL player
Eugene Sledge, US Marine, author, professor
Leighton W. Smith Jr., admiral in US Navy
John Steber, former NFL player
Mickey Sutton, former NFL player
Erick Walder, long jumper, Olympic Silver Medal, 1997 Athens
Clifton "C. C." Williams, NASA astronaut and US Marine
Jerrel Wilson, former NFL player Kansas City Chiefs, Mississippi Sports Hall of Fame 2011

References

External links

Murphy High School
Murphy High School Alumni Association

National Register of Historic Places in Mobile, Alabama
High schools in Mobile, Alabama
International Baccalaureate schools in Alabama
Educational institutions established in 1926
Public high schools in Alabama
1926 establishments in Alabama